Ghana competed at the 1964 Summer Olympics in Tokyo, Japan.

Medalists

Results by event

Athletics
Men's 100 metres
 Stanley Fabian Allotey
 Round 1 — 10.7 s (→ 7th in heat, did not advance)
 Michael Ahey
 Round 1 — 10.6 s (→ 7th in heat, did not advance)

Men's 200 metres
 Michael Okantey
 Round 1 — 21.9 s (→ 6th in heat, did not advance)

Men's 400 metres
 Ebenezer Quartey
 Round 1 — 47.1 s (→ 2nd in heat, advanced to 2nd round)
 Round 2 — 47.0 s (→ 7th in heat, did not advance)

 Samuel Owusu-Mensah
 Round 1 — DNS

Men's 1500 metres
 Eric Amevor
 Round 1 — 3:58.4 min (→ 11th in heat, did not advance)

Men's 4x100 metres relay
 Michael Okantey, Michael Ahey, Ebenezer Charle O. Addy, Stanley Fabian Allotey
 Round 1 — 40.8 s (→ 5th in heat, advanced to semi-final)
 Semi-Final — 40.7 s (→ 8th in heat, did not advance)

Men's 4x400 metres relay
 James Addy, Brobbey Mensah, Samuel Zanya Bugri, Ebenezer Quartey
 Round 1 — 3:10.4 min (→ 5th in heat, did not advance)

Men's long jump
 Michael Ahey
 Qualification — 753 cm (→ advanced to the final)
 Final — 730 cm (→ 7th place)

Women's 100 metres
 Rose Hart
 Round 1 — 11.9 s (→ 5th in heat, advanced to 2nd round)
 Round 2 — 11.9 s (→ 6th in heat, did not advance)

 Christiana Boateng
 Round 1 — 12.9 s (→ 8th in heat, did not advance)

Women's 80 metre hurdles
 Rose Hart
 Round 1 — 11.3 s (→ 3rd in heat, advanced to semi-finals)
 Semi Final — 11.1 s (→ 8th in heat, did not advance)

Women's long jump
 Alice Anum
 Qualification — 545 cm (→ did not advance)

Boxing

Flyweight
 Sulley Shittu
 Round 1 — defeated Jumaat Ibrahim (MAL) KO-1 2:17
 Round 2 — lost to John Anthony McCafferty (IRL) 2:3

Bantamweight
 Cassis Aryee
 Round 1 — defeated Thein Myint (BIR) KO-2 2:03
 Round 2 — lost to Takao Sakurai (JPN) 0:5

Lightweight
 Sammy Lee Amekudji
 Round 1 — bye
 Round 2 — lost to Kanemaru Shiratori (JPN) KO-1 1:27

Light welterweight
 Eddie Blay
 Round 1 — bye
 Round 2 — defeated Preben R.S. Rasmussen (DEN) 5:0
 Round 3 — defeated Nol Touch (CAM) KO-2 1:34
 Quarterfinals — defeated Joao Henrique Da Silva (BRA) 5:0
 Semi-finals — lost to Jerzy Kulej (POL) 0:5

Light middleweight
 Eddie Davies
 Round 1 — defeated Laszlo Sebok (HUN) 5:0
 Round 2 — defeated Tolman Gibson Jr. (USA) 5:0
 Quarterfinals — lost to Boris Lagutin (SOV) RET

Middleweight
 Joe Darkey
 Round 1 — bye
 Round 2 — defeated James Columbus Rosette (USA) 3:2
 Quarterfinals — lost to Valery Popenchenko (SOV) 0:5

Light Heavyweight
 Thomas Arimi
 Round 1 — bye
 Round 2 — lost to Sayed Mersal (UAR) 0:5

Football

Group D

Quarterfinals

Nations at the 1964 Summer Olympics
1964
1964 in Ghanaian sport